20α-Dihydroprogesterone (20α-DHP), also known as 20α-hydroxyprogesterone (20α-OHP), is a naturally occurring, endogenous progestogen. It is a metabolite of progesterone, formed by the 20α-hydroxysteroid dehydrogenases (20α-HSDs) AKR1C1, AKR1C2, and AKR1C3 and the 17β-hydroxysteroid dehydrogenase (17β-HSD) HSD17B1. 20α-DHP can be transformed back into progesterone by 20α-HSDs and by the 17β-HSD HSD17B2. HSD17B2 is expressed in the human endometrium and cervix among other tissues. In animal studies, 20α-DHP has been found to be selectively taken up into and retained in target tissues such as the uterus, brain, and skeletal muscle.

20α-DHP has very low affinity for the progesterone receptor and is much less potent as a progestogen in comparison to progesterone, with about one-fifth of the relative progestogenic activity. It has also been found to act as an aromatase inhibitor and to inhibit the production of estrogen in breast tissue in vitro.

A single 200-mg oral dose of micronized progesterone has been found to result in peak levels of 20α-DHP of around 1 ng/mL after 2 hours. In another study however, peak levels of 20α-DHP were around 10 ng/mL during therapy with 300 mg/day oral micronized progesterone. 20α-DHP is formed from progesterone in the liver and in target tissues such as the endometrium. It appears to be more slowly eliminated than progesterone.

Levels of 5α-DHP have been quantified.

See also
 20β-Dihydroprogesterone
 17α-Hydroxyprogesterone
 16α-Hydroxyprogesterone
 5α-Dihydroprogesterone
 11-Deoxycorticosterone

References

Secondary alcohols
Aromatase inhibitors
Human metabolites
Enones
Pregnanes
Progestogens
Steroid hormones